, provisional designation , is an asteroid on an eccentric orbit, classified as near-Earth object and potentially hazardous asteroid of the Apollo group, approximately  in diameter. The asteroid was discovered on 29 September 1998, by astronomers of the LINEAR program at Lincoln Laboratory's Experimental Test Site near Socorro, New Mexico, in the United States. It is one of the largest potentially hazardous asteroids and has a notably low Earth-MOID of less than the distance to the Moon.

Orbit and classification 

 is a member of the dynamical Apollo group, which are Earth-crossing asteroids. Apollo asteroids are the largest subgroup of near-Earth objects.

It orbits the Sun at a distance of 0.7–3.2 AU once every 2 years and 8 months (975 days; semi-major axis of 1.92 AU). Its orbit has a high eccentricity of 0.64 and an inclination of 11° with respect to the ecliptic. The body's observation arc begins with its official discovery observation at Socorro in September 1998.

Close approaches 

At about absolute magnitude 15.6,  is one of the brightest and presumably largest known potentially hazardous asteroid (see PHA-list).

 is also a Venus- and Mars-crosser, as it crosses the orbit of Venus and the Red Planet at  0.72 and 1.66 AU, respectively.

Physical characteristics 

 is an assumed, stony S-type asteroid.

Rotation period 

Lightcurve analysis gave a rotation period of 5.370 and 5.66 hours and a brightness variation of 0.18 and 0.06 magnitude, respectively, one of which gave an alternative period solution of  hours. In April 2016, the EURONEAR lightcurve survey measured a period of 5.398 hours with an amplitude of 0.12 magnitude.

Diameter and albedo 

Surveys contrast: of the Japanese Akari satellite and the NEOWISE mission of NASA's Wide-field Infrared Survey Explorer.  These measure the object as between 2 and 3.484 kilometers lengthways (in diameter) and to have an albedo (optical wavelength reflectivity) between 0.076 and 0.237. The Collaborative Asteroid Lightcurve Link assumes a stony typical albedo of 0.20 to calculate the diameter as 2.25 kilometers and an absolute magnitude of 15.6.

Numbering and naming 

This minor planet was numbered by the Minor Planet Center on 30 August 2004. As of 2018, it has not been named.

Notes

References

External links 
 Asteroid Lightcurve Database (LCDB), query form (info )
 Dictionary of Minor Planet Names, Google books
 
 
 

085713
085713
085713
19980929